Leslie ("Les") Morton (born 1 July 1955 in Sheffield, West Riding of Yorkshire) is a retired male race walker from England, who twice competed for Great Britain at the Summer Olympics (1988 and 1992). He set his personal best (3:57.48) in the 50 km race in 1989.

International competitions

References

1958 births
Living people
Sportspeople from Sheffield
British male racewalkers
English male racewalkers
Olympic athletes of Great Britain
Athletes (track and field) at the 1988 Summer Olympics
Athletes (track and field) at the 1992 Summer Olympics
World Athletics Championships athletes for Great Britain